Six-Roads is a settlement in New Brunswick, Canada. The Community is located mainly at the intersection of Route 355 and Route 11. Since 2014 it has been part of the Regional Municipality of Tracadie.

History

Notable people

See also
List of communities in New Brunswick

References
 

Neighbourhoods in Grand Tracadie-Sheila
Former municipalities in New Brunswick